The 1960 Miami Redskins football team was an American football team that represented Miami University in the Mid-American Conference (MAC) during the 1960 NCAA University Division football season. In its fifth season under head coach John Pont, Miami compiled a 6–4 record (2-3 against MAC opponents), finished in third place in the MAC, and were outscored by all opponents by a combined total of 159 to 139.

Dave Kaiser, C. Edward Keating, Napoleon Reid, and Roger Turvy were the team captains. John Moore, who led the team with 616 rushing yards, 1,026 all-purpose yards, and 48 points, received the team's most valuable player awards. Other statistical leaders included Jack Gayheart with 441 passing yards and Howie Millisor with 261 receiving yards.

Schedule

References

Miami
Miami RedHawks football seasons
Miami Redskins football